V500 may refer to:
V500 Aquilae, a nova
LG G Pad 8.3, a tablet computer produced by LG Electronics, also known as V500
Motorola V500, a mobile phone produced by Motorola